Frederick "Fred" Firth (1870 – February 1936) was an English rugby union, and professional rugby league footballer who played in the 1890s and 1900s. Prior to Tuesday 27 August 1895, Halifax was a rugby union club.

Background
Fred Firth was born in Cleckheaton, West Riding of Yorkshire, England, and he died aged 65–66 in Olneyville, Providence, Rhode Island, United States.

Playing career

International honours
Fred Firth won three caps for England (RU) while at Halifax in 1894 against Wales, Ireland, and Scotland.

County honours
Fred Firth won caps for Yorkshire (RL) while at Halifax.

Change of Code
When Halifax converted from the rugby union code to the rugby league code on Tuesday 27 August 1895, Fred Firth would have been approximately 25. Consequently, he was both a rugby union, and rugby league footballer for Halifax.

Club career
Fred Firth made his début for Wakefield Trinity during October 1899, and he played his last match for Wakefield Trinity during the 1900–01 season, he appears to have scored no drop-goals (or field-goals as they are currently known in Australasia), but prior to the 1974–75 season all goals, whether; conversions, penalties, or drop-goals, scored 2-points, consequently prior to this date drop-goals were often not explicitly documented, therefore '0' drop-goals may indicate drop-goals not recorded, rather than no drop-goals scored. In addition, prior to the 1949–50 season, the archaic field-goal was also still a valid means of scoring points.

References

1870 births
1936 deaths
England international rugby union players
English rugby league players
English rugby union players
Footballers who switched code
Halifax R.L.F.C. players
People from Cleckheaton
Rugby league centres
Rugby league players from Yorkshire
Rugby league wingers
Rugby union players from Yorkshire
Rugby union wings
Wakefield Trinity players
Yorkshire rugby league team players